Louis Grimaldi (died 5 November 1402) was Lord of Monaco from 1395 until 1402.

Notes 

14th-century births
1402 deaths
14th-century Lords of Monaco
15th-century Lords of Monaco
House of Grimaldi
Lords of Monaco